Songs in the Key of Springfield is a soundtrack/novelty album from The Simpsons compiling many of the musical numbers from the series. The album was released in the United States on March 18, 1997, and in the United Kingdom in June 1997. This was the second album released in association with the Simpsons television series; however, the previous release, The Simpsons Sing the Blues, contained original recordings as opposed to songs featured in episodes of the series.

The album was followed by The Yellow Album, a second album of original songs. Hollywood Records released the album on digital and streaming platforms on December 9, 2021.

Music
The first track, which is the extended version of the main title theme, notes that it is from the episode "Cape Feare". However, the actual episode does feature the extended opening and the same couch gag (the "chorus line" version), but Lisa's sax solo is different from the version featured on the album. Similarly, syndicated reruns of "Cape Feare" replace the entire opening altogether with the couch gag with the Simpsons finding exact doubles of themselves on the couch. However, the opening sequence that matches the one on the CD was used, complete with the same sax solo and couch gag, on the episodes "Monty Can't Buy Me Love", "Simpson Safari" and "The Bart Wants What It Wants", which aired well after the album's release.

Cultural reference
The title is taken from the Stevie Wonder album Songs in the Key of Life. Another FOX TV show, The X-Files, had a soundtrack album entitled Songs in the Key of X. The Simpsons podcast Pods in the Key of Springfield is named after this album.

Chart performance
Compared to the previous album released in The Simpsons franchise, The Simpsons Sing the Blues, the album failed to match the success of their previous record. It managed to peak at number 18 in the United Kingdom, where it would become the last charting album for the franchise in that country.

The album was less successful in the United States, where it peaked at #103 on the Billboard 200. However, it was successful on Billboards Top Kid Audio chart, where it peaked at number one, becoming the first number one on that chart for the franchise.

The album was certified Silver by the British Phonographic Industry twice in the UK. On March 19, 1999 on the Warner Records label and again on July 22, 2013 on the Rhino Entertainment label.

Track listing
"The Simpsons Theme" (by Danny Elfman)
"We Do" (The Stonecutters' Song) - from the episode "Homer the Great"
Marge & Homer introduction
The Stonecutters
"Dancin' Homer" (Medley) - from the episode "Dancin' Homer"
Crosstown Bridge - The Simpsons – 0:10
Capitol City
The Simpsons
Tony Bennett
"Homer & Apu" (Medley) - from the episode "Homer and Apu"
Who Needs the Kwik-E-Mart?
Lisa introduction
The Simpsons
Apu
Who Needs the Kwik-E-Mart? (Reprise)
Homer & Marge introduction
Homer
Apu
"Round Springfield" (Medley) - from the episode 'Round Springfield"
Bleeding Gums Blues
Lisa & DJ introduction
Bleeding Gums Murphy
Lisa
Alto saxophone solo by Dan Higgins
A Four-Headed King
Bleeding Gums Murphy
Lisa
Cast
There She Sits, Brokenhearted
Bleeding Gums Murphy
Lisa
Jazzman (by Carole King and David Palmer)
Bleeding Gums Murphy
Lisa
Alto saxophone solo by Dan Higgins
Baritone saxophone solo by Terry Harrington
"Oh, Streetcar!" (The Musical) - from the episode "A Streetcar Named Marge"
White-Hot Grease Fires (Prologue)
Director (Jon Lovitz)
Cast
Long Before the Superdome
Chief Wiggum
New Orleans
Cast
I Thought My Life Would Be a Mardi Gras
Marge & Cast introduction
Marge
Apu
I Am Just a Simple Paper Boy
Apu
Stella
Ned Flanders
She Flies
(instrumental)
The Kindness of Strangers
Marge
Cast
"Jingle Bells" (by James Pierpont) - from the episode "$pringfield (Or, How I Learned to Stop Worrying and Love Legalized Gambling)"
Robert Goulet
Bart
Smithers
Mr. Burns
Nelson
"$pringfield" (Medley) - from the episode "$pringfield (Or, How I Learned to Stop Worrying and Love Legalized Gambling)"
The Simpsons End Credits Theme ("Big Band Vegas" Version)
Gracie Films Logo (Vegas version with slot machine sound at the end)
"Itchy & Scratchy Main Title Theme" (by Robert Israel & Sam Simon) - from the episode "Itchy & Scratchy & Marge"
"Itchy & Scratchy End Credits Theme" - from The Episode "The Front"
"The Day the Violence Died" (Medley) - from the episode "The Day the Violence Died"
Not Jazz Chor, but Sad Chor"
Krusty the Clown
The Amendment Song (by John Swartzwelder)
Jack Sheldon with Kid
Bart
Lisa
Cast
"Señor Burns" - from the episode "Who Shot Mr. Burns?"
Tito Puente & His Latin Jazz Ensemble
"The Simpsons End Credits Theme" ("Afro-Cuban" Version) - from the episode "Who Shot Mr. Burns?" (Part Two)
Tito Puente & His Latin Jazz Ensemble – 0:47
"Your Wife Don't Understand You" - from the episode "Colonel Homer"
Announcer & Cast introduction
Lurleen (Beverly D'Angelo)
Homer
"Kamp Krusty" (Medley) - from the episode "Kamp Krusty"
South of the Border" (by Jimmy Kennedy and Michael Carr)
Bart & Krusty introduction
Gene Merlino
Gracie Films Logo (Mexican version with "Ole!" at the end)
"The Simpsons End Credits Theme" ("Australian" Version) - from the episode "Bart vs. Australia"
"The Simpsons End Credits Theme" ("Hill Street Blues" Version) - from the episode "The Springfield Connection"
"The Simpsons End Credits Theme" ("It's a Mad, Mad, Mad, Mad World" Version) - from the episode "Homer the Vigilante"
"Treehouse of Horror V" (Medley) - from the episode "Treehouse of Horror V"
Controlling the Transmission (Prologue)
Bart
Homer
The Simpsons Halloween Special Main Title Theme
"Honey Roasted Peanuts" - from the episode "Boy-Scoutz 'n the Hood"
Homer
Marge
"Boy Scoutz N the Hood" (Medley) - from the episode "Boy-Scoutz N The Hood"
Saved by the Bell
Apu
Milhouse
Bart
Jackpot
Milhouse
Bart
Springfield, Springfield (Parts 1 & 2)
Bart
Milhouse
Cast
Remember This?
Bart
Lisa
Another Edwardian Morning
Bart
Marge
Homer
"Two Dozen and One Greyhounds" (Medley) - from the episode "Two Dozen and One Greyhounds"
The Pick of the Litter
Mr. Burns
Lisa
See My Vest
Smithers introduction
Mr. Burns
Maid
Lisa
Bart
"Eye on Springfield" Theme - from the episode "Flaming Moe's"
Kent Brockman introduction
Homer
"Flaming Moe's" - from the episode "Flaming Moe's"
Kipp Lennon
Cast
"Homer's Barbershop Quartet" (Medley) - from the episode "Homer's Barbershop Quartet"
One Last Call (by Les Applegate)
Principal Skinner
Apu
Baby on Board
The Be Sharps
Cast
"TV Sucks!" - a dialogue sequence from the episode "Itchy & Scratchy: The Movie"
Homer
Bart
"A Fish Called Selma" (Medley) - from the episode "A Fish Called Selma"
Troy Chic
Agent MacArthur Parker (Jeff Goldblum)
Troy McClure
Stop the Planet of the Apes
Dr. Zaius
Troy McClure
Bart
Homer
Cast
Chimpan-A to Chimpan-Z
Troy McClure
Cast
Send in the Clowns (by Stephen Sondheim) - from the episode "Krusty Gets Kancelled"
Announcer introduction
Krusty the Clown
Sideshow Mel
"The Monorail Song" - from the episode "Marge vs. the Monorail"
Lyle Lanley
Cast
"In Search of an Out of Body Vibe" - a dialogue sequence from the episode "Lady Bouvier's Lover"
Grampa
Mrs. Bouvier
"Cool" - from the episode "Lady Bouvier's Lover"
Homer
Grampa
"Bagged Me a Homer" (by Beverly D'Angelo) - from the episode "Colonel Homer"
Lurleen (Beverly D'Angelo)
Recording Studio Guy
Homer
Marge
Baritone saxophone solo by Terry Harrington
Harmonica solo by Tommy Morgan
"It Was a Very Good Beer" (by Ervin Drake) - from the episode "Duffless"
Homer
"Bart Sells His Soul" (Medley) - from the episode "Bart Sells His Soul"
From God's Brain to Your Mouth
Bart
"In-A-Gadda-Da-Vida" (by Doug Ingle)
Reverend Lovejoy
Bart
Milhouse
Homer
Cast
"Happy Birthday, Lisa" (by Michael Jackson, credited to W. A. Mozart, due to contractual obligations) - from the episode "Stark Raving Dad"
Lisa & Bart introduction
Leon Kompowski (Kipp Lennon)
Bart
Lisa
"The Simpsons Halloween Special End Credits Theme" ("The Addams Family" Version) - from the episode "Treehouse of Horror IV"
"Who Shot Mr. Burns?" (Part One) (Medley) - from the episode "Who Shot Mr. Burns?" (Part One)
Who Dunnit?
The Simpsons End Credits Theme ("JFK" Version)
"Lisa's Wedding" (Medley) - from the episode "Lisa's Wedding"
The Simpsons End Credits Theme" ("Renaissance" Version)
Gracie Films Logo ("Renaissance" Version)
"The Simpsons End Credits Theme" ("Dragnet" Version) - from the episode "Marge on the Lam"

Charts

Weekly charts

Year-end charts

Certifications

References

The Simpsons soundtrack albums
Albums produced by Steve Bartek
1997 soundtrack albums
Television animation soundtracks
Rhino Records soundtracks
Rhino Records compilation albums
Albums with cover art by Matt Groening
Hollywood Records compilation albums
Hollywood Records soundtracks